The current ranking of railway stations operated by the Deutsche Bahn in Lower Saxony, Germany, is given in the table below. Note that Hbf is the abbreviation for Hauptbahnhof (main or central station).

All other stations belong to the lowest categories, classes 6 and 7.

Sources

See also
German railway station categories
Railway station types of Germany
List of scheduled railway routes in Germany

External links 
 Online timetable of DB services

 
Low
Rail